Ministry of Human Rights may refer to:

 Ministry of Human Rights (Brazil)
 Ministry of Law and Human Rights (Indonesia)
 Ministry of Human Rights (Iraq)
 Ministry of Human Rights (Pakistan)
 Ministry of Human Rights (Somalia)

See also
Centre for Human Rights (disambiguation)